This list of museums in Greater Manchester, England contains museums which are defined for this context as institutions (including nonprofit organizations, government entities, and private businesses) that collect and care for objects of cultural, artistic, scientific, or historical interest and make their collections or related exhibits available for public viewing. Also included are non-profit art galleries and university art galleries.  Museums that exist only in cyberspace (i.e., virtual museums) are not included.

Defunct museums
 Cube Gallery, Manchester, closed in 2013
 Setantii Museum, Ashton-under-Lyne, closed in 2012
 Urbis, former independent exhibition space, now home to the National Football Museum
 Vernon Park Museum, Offerton, closed in 2012
 Manchester Art Museum, also known as the Horsfall Museum or Ancoats Museum. It closed in 1953 and its contents were absorbed into the collection of Manchester City Art Gallery.
 The Cornerhouse was a centre for cinema and the contemporary visual arts. It merged with the Library Theatre Company, becoming HOME and relocating to a purpose-built site.

See also
 :Category:Tourist attractions in Greater Manchester

References

Manchester Museums
Visit Manchester

 
Greater Manchester
Museums